The  is a kei car produced by the Japanese automobile manufacturer Daihatsu that was sold between 2006 and 2009.

The production of the vehicle began in 2006, after having revealed it as a concept car named "SK Tourer" earlier in the same year. It was available  in three grade levels: R, RS and RS Limited. The Sonica was discontinued in April 2009.

The name "Sonica" is derived from the word "sonic".

References 

Sonica
Cars introduced in 2006
Kei cars
Hatchbacks
Front-wheel-drive vehicles
All-wheel-drive vehicles
Vehicles with CVT transmission